Thomas Haughey (1826 – August 5, 1869) was a U.S. Representative from Alabama.

Early life and education 
Born in Glasgow, Scotland, Haughey received a limited education. He immigrated with his father to the United States, where they settled in New York City. In 1841, he moved to Jefferson County, Alabama. While teaching in St. Clair County, he studied medicine. Haughey attended New Orleans Medical College and graduated as both a physician and surgeon in 1858, starting a medical practice in Elyton.

Career 
During the onset of the Civil War, Haughey was against both war and secession and was sympathetic to the North and the plight of slaves. He did not hide his views and joined the Union League, but soon fled to Kentucky due to threats to his safety. Once there, he joined the Union Army's 3rd Regiment Tennessee Volunteer Infantry as a surgeon, serving from January 1862 to his honorable discharge on February 23, 1865 when the regiment was mustered out. After the war, he resumed his medical practice in Decatur, Alabama.

Politics 
He served as delegate to the State constitutional convention in 1867. Upon the readmission of the State of Alabama to representation, Haughey was elected as a Republican to the 40th US Congress. He served from July 21, 1868, to March 3, 1869. After returning to Alabama, Haughey began a campaign for reelection, giving speeches throughout the district. Running as an Independent Republican, his opponents were regular Republican candidate Jerome J. Hinds, a protégé of Senator George E. Spencer, and Democrat William Crawford Sherrod.

The race was intense with accusations of theft, bribery, corruption, and perjury between the candidates.

Death 
At a speech before a crowd at the courthouse in Courtland, Alabama on July 31, Haughey came into a confrontation with a man named Collins, an ally of Hinds who espoused the cause of his Republican opponent. When Haughey was said to have been obnoxious toward Collins, a man known to be prone to violence, a fistfight ensued. The altercation ended when Collins pulled a pistol and fired it into Haughey's stomach. Confined to a bed, Haughey lingered on for five days before succumbing to his wounds on August 5, 1869 at age 43. He was interred in Green Cemetery near Pinson, Alabama.

See also
List of assassinated American politicians
List of United States Congress members killed or wounded in office
List of United States Congress members who died in office (1790–1899)

References

External links

1826 births
1869 deaths
19th-century American politicians
Assassinated American politicians
Deaths by firearm in Alabama
People murdered in Alabama
People of Alabama in the American Civil War
Physicians from Alabama
Republican Party members of the United States House of Representatives from Alabama
Scottish emigrants to the United States
Southern Unionists in the American Civil War
Tulane University alumni
Union Army surgeons
Assassinated United States House candidates